The following names are sorted alphabetically.
Antoni Abad - artist (born 1956)
Jaume Balagueró - filmmaker (born 1960)
Josep Borrell - Politician, president of the European Parliament 2004–2007. (born 1947)
Francesc Claverol - 18th century religious scholar, author of De ineffabile misae sacrificio y Libellum de Adventu Anti Christi.
Pep Coll - writer (born 1949)
Albert Costa - tennis player, olympic contestant in 2000, winner of the 2002 French Open, (born 1975)
Leandre Cristòfol - artist, pioneer of Surrealist sculpture in Catalonia (1908–1998)
Custo Dalmau - fashion designer (born 1959).
Sergi Escobar - world champion track cyclist who specialises in individual and team pursuit (born 1974).
José Espasa Anguera - founder of the precursor of Espasa-Calpe and Enciclopedia Espasa (1840–1911)
Adolf Florensa - architect, urban planner who worked for various governments during the 20th century directing the restoration of Ciutat Vella in Barcelona.
Miguel Ángel Gallardo - underground comic book artist, especially known for his controversial comic series Makoki, published in the Spanish magazine El Víbora.
Indíbil (Indibilis, Andobales) king of the Ilergetes (3rd century BC).
Lorena, singer, winner of the 5th series of Spanish Fame Academy, Operación Triunfo.
Enrique Granados - Romantic composer (1867-1917)
Mari Pau Huguet - Catalan TV personality, TV3 presenter.
Bojan Krkic - (born 1990) football player.
Josep Lladonosa - historian (1907–1990)
Mercè Mor - dancer.
Jaume Morera - Artist (1854–1927)
Joan Oró - biochemist whose research has been of importance in understanding the origin of life, received several international honours for his work. (1923–2004)
Manuel del Palacio - Satirist, journalist (1831–1906)
Josep Pernau - journalist, satyrist (1930–2011)
Araceli Segarra - mountaineer and model (born 1970)
Salvador Seguí, "El Noi del Sucre" - Anarchist, secretary general of CNT in Catalonia, assassinated (1896–1923).
Antoni Siurana - Politician; former mayor of Lleida, then Minister of Agriculture, Fisheries and Food (born 1943)
Humbert Torres - Physician and politician, vicepresident of the Generalitat de Catalunya, member of the Spanish Parliament.
Màrius Torres - Symbolist poet (1910-1942)
Jaume Ulled - stage actor (born 1978)
Josep Vallverdú - writer (born 1923)
Salvador Vázquez de Parga - essayist, comic book historian (born 1934)
Ricardo Viñes - Classical pianist and composer (1875–1943)

See also
List of mayors of Lleida
List of bishops of Lleida

Lleida
 
Lleida
Lists of people by city in Spain